is a machine tool  manufacturing company based  in Fukui, Fukui Prefecture, Japan, in operation since August 1935.

Matsuura Machinery began as a manufacturer and distributor of lathes in 1935. Production of milling machines began in 1957, and the company went public in 1960. Production of automatic-controlled milling machines began in 1961 and numerically controlled milling machines from 1964. Production of automatically controlled drilling machines began in 1972, and vertical machining centers from 1974.

The company began exporting to the United States from 1975. In 1981, Matsuura Machinery began production of high-speed machining centers and twin-spindle vertical machining centers, and horizontal machining centers from 1983. The total number of machining centers shipped surpassed 10,000 units in 1993 and 20,000 in 2015.

The company's machining centers are used in a variety of industries, among them aerospace equipment manufacturers. Machine tools manufactured by Matsuura were used by NASA on the Space Shuttle Discovery's fuel tanks in 1998, making them four tons lighter than before.

References

External links

Matsuura Machinery Corporation global website

Manufacturing companies of Japan
Engineering companies of Japan
Companies based in Fukui Prefecture
Machine tool builders
Manufacturing companies established in 1935
Japanese brands
Japanese companies established in 1935